Anglimp-South Wahgi District is a district of the Jiwaka Province of Papua New Guinea.  Its capital is Minj.  The population of the district was 194,109 at the 2011 census. Before May 2012, it was part of the Western Highlands Province.

References

Districts of Papua New Guinea
Jiwaka Province